Skorpionite (IMA2005-010) is a zinc phosphate mineral with chemical formula Ca3Zn2(PO4)2CO3(OH)2·H2O, originally found in the Skorpion Mine and named after it (Rosh Pinah, Lüderitz district, ǁKaras Region, Namibia).

References 

 

Phosphate minerals
Monoclinic minerals
Minerals in space group 15